The 1972–73 Kentucky Wildcats men's basketball team represented the University of Kentucky in the 1972–73 college basketball season. The team's head coach was Joe B. Hall, who was in his first season, taking over for Adolph Rupp. They played their home games at Memorial Coliseum and were members of the Southeastern Conference.

References

External links
 1972-73 Kentucky Wildcats Roster and Stats at Sports-Reference.com

Kentucky
Kentucky Wildcats men's basketball seasons
Kentucky
Kentucky Wildcats
Kentucky Wildcats